Vasili Dmitriyevich Kuznetsov (7 February 1932 – 6 August 2001) was a Soviet and Russian decathlete who won the European title in 1954, 1958 and 1962. He competed for the Soviet Union at the 1956, 1960 and 1964 Olympics and won bronze medals in 1956 and 1960, placing seventh in 1964.

Kuznetsov took up athletics in the late 1940s and won a record 10 national decathlon titles in 1953-60 and 1962-63. He set two decathlon world records: in May 1958, he was the first athlete to break the 8,000 points barrier on the 1952 scoring system, with 8,014 points (7,653 (1985)) in Krasnodar. He set his second world record in May 1959 at 8,357 (7,839 (1985)). He also held three pentathlon world records at 3,736 in 1956, 3,901 in 1958, and 4,006 in 1959. Kuznetsov retired after the 1964 Olympics to become an athletics coach and lecturer at the Moscow State University. In 1987 he was included into the list of 10 all-time best decathletes by the IAAF.

References

External links

 Biography at Infosport.ru 
 

1932 births
2001 deaths
Russian decathletes
Soviet decathletes
Olympic bronze medalists for the Soviet Union
Athletes (track and field) at the 1956 Summer Olympics
Athletes (track and field) at the 1960 Summer Olympics
Athletes (track and field) at the 1964 Summer Olympics
Olympic athletes of the Soviet Union
Burevestnik (sports society) athletes
Sportspeople from Ryazan Oblast
European Athletics Championships medalists
Medalists at the 1960 Summer Olympics
Medalists at the 1956 Summer Olympics
Olympic bronze medalists in athletics (track and field)
Universiade medalists in athletics (track and field)
Universiade gold medalists for the Soviet Union

Honoured Masters of Sport of the USSR
Recipients of the Order of the Red Banner of Labour
Burials at Vagankovo Cemetery